JSAT may refer to:

SKY Perfect JSAT Group, a communication satellite operator and digital TV broadcaster of Japan
JSAT Corporation, a communications satellite operator company that was absorbed by SKY Perfect JSAT Group in 2008
JSAT (satellite constellation), a satellite fleet formerly operated by JSAT Corporation and currently by SKY Perfect JSAT Group